Martin Stehlik (born October 23, 1989) is an Austrian footballer who currently plays as a midfielder for First Vienna FC.

External links
 

1989 births
Living people
Austrian footballers
Floridsdorfer AC players
Wiener Sport-Club players
First Vienna FC players
Association football midfielders
2. Liga (Austria) players